Miftah Muhammed K'eba or Miftah Muhammad Kuayba (born July 16, 1947) is a Libyan politician who was the Secretary-General of the General People's Congress of Libya from 3 March 2008 to 5 March 2009 and as such head of state. He also was the Secretary of Justice during the 1980s.

References

Living people
1942 births
Heads of state of Libya
Secretaries-General of the General People's Congress
Justice ministers of Libya